Tangkak (Jawi: تڠكق) is a town and the capital of Tangkak District in Johor, Malaysia. The town is nicknamed "Fabric Town" or "Syurga Kain" in honour of its many textile shops. It is also well known as being a major entry point to Mount Ledang, the highest mountain in Johor.

History, Etymology and Infrastructure

Tangkak is located in the north-western corner of the state of Johore, bordering Malacca by the Kesang River and Chohong River and was formerly the second largest town in Muar District with full of loan shark.

Tangkak was founded in the year 1901 at the foot of Mt. Ophir (1276m high) and was under the direct control of Muar district then. In 1946, the local council was established and was governed by the Assistant District Officer who in turn reported to the Muar District Office in those days.

According to hearsay, the word Tangkak came from the Malay word merangkak, meaning to crawl. It was believed that Long Mahmud had led 7 brothers from the Riau Province (in Indonesia) to start the first settlement that is today Tangkak. These 7 brothers had sailed from Riau Province and sailing along the Kesang River before finally arriving at Tangkak River. They saw the flat terrain and decided to stay put at the place. Unfortunately they had difficulties getting up the river bank as their legs got stuck at the slippery river mud. They had to use the roots of trees to help them to get on land. When other settlers asked them the name of the place, they will answer tang merangkak tu. Over a period of time, it was shortened to Tangkak, the name of the settlement today.

This town is linked to the famous mountain - Mount Ledang where it was said that the most beautiful princess resided there in ancient times. This princess, known as Puteri Gunung Ledang, had the last Sultan of the Malacca Sultanate so smitten with her that he had sent his top warrior, Hang Tuah, to ask her for her hand in marriage. Myth or otherwise, Hang Tuah never came back after his second visit to the mountain.

Developments
The sub-districts of Tangkak and Muar; referred as Muar Utara and  Muar Selatan respectively earlier. The Tangkak district was the northern part of the Muar district which was separated from the southern part by the Muar River. In 2006 both were administratively were divided and Tangkak was upgraded to a full-fledged district, and it was initially named as the Ledang district after the Mount Ledang nearby. The Ledang district covers Tangkak town, Tanjung Agas, Kesang, Sungai Mati, Serom, Sagil and Bukit Gambir. A ceremony headed by the sultan on 9 June 2008 saw the official proclamation of that northern part becoming Johor's 10th district named Ledang District. The district was then renamed Tangkak District at the end of 2015 by the decree of Sultan Ibrahim Ismail to preserve the historical value of traditional name of places in the state.

Politics
Tangkak has its own constituency in the Johor State Legislative Assembly. The seat is currently held by Ee Chin Li of the Democratic Action Party (DAP) from Pakatan Harapan (PH) ruling coalition.

At the national level, Tangkak under the parliamentary constituency of Ledang, currently held by Syed Ibrahim Syed Nor of People's Justice Party (PKR) from PH too, the federal ruling coalition.

Transportation

Car
Tangkak has an extensive network of roads including proximity to the North-South Expressway. The PLUS Expressway has an exit to Tangkak. Federal Federal Route 23 links Tangkak to Muar in the south and Segamat in the north.

Education
Johor Matriculation College (KMJ)
Ledang Vocational College
SMK Sagil Tangkak
SMK Ledang
SMK Sri Tangkak
SMK Tun Mamat
SJK (C) Chi Ming 1
SJK (C) Chi Ming 2

References

External links

 Towns and Cities in Malaysia
 Muar to say goodbye to Tangkak, The Star, November 20, 2006
  More information in Chinese, please refer to http://www.ledang.org.my/default.aspx

Towns in Johor
Tangkak District